The following institutions are located in Kasaragod district in the Indian state of Kerala:

 Primary schools: 411
 Secondary schools: 116
 Colleges: 40
 University: 1

Universities

 Central University of Kerala

Organisations

Central Plantation Crops Research Institute (CPCRI)

Central Plantation Crops Research Institute (CPCRI) was established in 1970 as one of the agricultural research institutes in the National Agricultural Research System (NARS) under the Indian Council of Agricultural Research (ICAR). The Kerala Coconut Research Station was initially established in 1916 by the then Government of Madras and subsequently it was taken over by the Indian Central Coconut Committee in 1948.

Malik Deenar Institute of Management Studies

Malik Deenar Institute of Management Studies (MDIMS)  conducts M.B.A. course at Seethamgoly near Kasaragod.

People Institute of Management Studies
People Institute of Management Studies (PIMS) in an institute offering MBA program, and is located at Munnad. The institute is affiliated to Kannur University, and approved by All India Council of Technical Education (AICTE). PIMS is managed by the Kasargod Educational Co-operative Society. The institute offers an MBA program with dual specialisation in Human Resources (HR), Marketing and Finance. Depending on student strength, specialisations in Tourism Management, and Banking and Insurance Management may also be offered. PIMS is a co-educational institute. Official Website: https://pims.ac.in/

L.B.S.- Lal Bahadur Shastry college of engineering, Kasaragod

(LBSCE)L.B.S College of Engineering, Povval, Kasaragod, was established in 1993 as a self-financing engineering college under the propitious of L.B.S Centre for Science and Technology, Thiruvananthapuram, a government of Kerala undertaking. The chairman of the Governing body is Hon’ble Chief Minister of Kerala and Vice-Chairman is Hon’ble Minister for Education, Govt. of Kerala. The institution is affiliated to Kannur University and is approved by AICTE, New Delhi. The college is accredited by National Board of Accreditation. The Campus is located at Muliyar, about 12 km from Kasaragod railway station, Kerala and 75 km from Mangalore airport, Karnataka. The campus covers 52-acre (210,000 m2) of land.

Government College, Kasaragod

The college is affiliated to Kannur University and has been recognized by the UGC under section 12b and 2f. The NAAC has been accredited with "A Grade" recently. The college has a campus of 42 acres and adequate built in area for its academic and related activities. During the last 25 years the college has expanded infrastructural facilities that in child Science blocks, PG blocks and men's hostel. A special mention may be made about the generous gesture by an old student of the college who provided the furniture in the auditorium. There is a botanical garden having a good number of medicinal plants. The green lawns, garden and other plants mainlined here have enhanced the beauty of the campus.

Courses conducted: BA, BSc., BCom, MA, MSc, PhD.

College of Engineering Trikaripur

It's an engineering college in Trikaripur affiliated to APJ Abdul Kalam Technological University.

Khansa Womens College For Advanced Studies, Kasaragod

Affiliated to Kannur University, Kannur
Kasaragod, Kerala
 
Courses:
Bachelor of Science (BSc Bio Chemistry)
Bachelor of Science (BSc Bio-Technology)
Bachelor of Science (BSc Microbiology)

Jamia Sa Adiya Arts and Science College, Kasaragod
(Part of Jamia Sa Adiya Arabiya Educational and Charitable Institution, Kasaragod) Affiliated to Kannur University, Kannur
Kasaragod, Kerala
 
Courses:
Bachelor of Science (BSc Bio-Technology)
Bachelor of Science (BSc Computer Science)
Bachelor of Arts in English (BA English)
Bachelor of Commerce (BCom)
Bachelor of Computer application (BCA)

Sharaf Arts & Science College, Padanna
Affiliated to Kannur University, Kannur
Kasaragod, Kerala
 
Courses:
Bachelor of Science (BSc Microbiology)
Bachelor of Science (BSc Bio-Technology)
Bachelor of Business Management (BBM)
Bachelor of Commerce in Computer Applications (BCCA)
Bachelor of Business Administration (BBA Tourism and Travel Management)

Zainab Memorial B Ed Centre, Kasaragod
(Part of National Council of Teacher Education (NCTE)) Affiliated to Kannur University, Kannur
Kasaragod, Kerala
 
Courses:
Bachelor of Education (BEd English)
Bachelor of Education (BEd Social Science)
Bachelor of Education (BEd Commerce)
Bachelor of Education (BEd Physical Science)
Bachelor of Education (BEd)

Other Colleges

Peoples arts & science college, munnad, Kasaragod
Co-operative arts & science college, Badiadka, Kasaragod
St. Gregories college of engineering, Perla, Kasaragod
Abdu razzaque kotti organisation school ( SSF ) kasaragod

G.H.S.S Alampady

Government Higher Secondary School Alampady (G.H.S.S Alampady) is one of the oldest school in Kasaragod, established in 1943 as a pre-primary school. The school is located at Alampady, about 7 km south of the town of Kasaragod.

Schools

 Aambika EM School
 AJI School, Ayyoor
 Ambedkar Vidyanikethan EM School
 Aliya Senior Secondary School
 Balabhavan EM School
 CHSS Chattanchal
 GHSS,Udma
 GHSS Chemnad
 Aliya Senior Secondary School, Paravanadukkam
 Apsara public school, Koliyadum
 Chemnad Jama Ath EM School
 Chemmanad Jama-ath Higher Secondary School
 Chinmaya Mission School
 Chinmaya Vidyalaya, Badiadka
 Chinmaya Vidyalaya, Kanhangad
 Chinmaya Vidyalaya, Nileshwaram
 Chinmaya Vidyalaya, Perikunnu 
 Crescent School
 CSI Nursery School
 Dakheerath EM High School
 Divine EM School
 Dune EM School
 Essa EM School, Peruwad
 Geethanjali EM School
 G.H.S.S Alampady
 G.H.S.S Badiadka
 GFHSS Bekal
 GLPS Nelliyadukka
 HFHSS Rajapuram
 ICC EM School
 Infant Jesus EM School
 Infant Jesus English School
 Islamic Center Trust EM School
 IEMHSS pallikere 
 Izzathul Islam EM School, Nalammile
 Jai Matha Convent EM School
 Jawahar Navodaya Vidyalaya
 Kasaragod Balabhavan EM School
 Kendriya Vidyalaya
 Kottapalli Valiyullahi EM School
 K.V.S.M.H.S Kurudapadavu
 Kunil Education Trust, Muttom
 Lax-An Rose School
 Little Flower GH School
 Little Lilly EM School
 Little Rose EM School
 MIC Higher Secondary School
 Mar Thoma School For The Deaf
 MES KS Abdullah School
 Mugamal Nursery School
 Muhimathul EM School
 Mujammau English Medium Senior Secondary School, Trikaripur
 Mofats English Medium School, Izzath nagar 
 Navajeevana HSS, Badiadka
 Naveen Bala Vidya Bhavan
 Sa-Adiya EM Residential Senior Secondary School
 Sirajul Huda English Medium School, Manjeshwar
 Seventh-day Adventist
 Shree Annapoorneshwari Higher Secondary School Agalpady (SAPHSS Agalpady)
 Sree Ramakrishna Vidyalaya
 Sree Ramakrishna Vidyalaya
 St Annes EM UP School
 St Anns Convent School
 St Marys EM School
 Swamy Nithyanda EM School
 The Model EM School
 TIHSS Naimarmoola.

References

 
Kasaragod district
GHSS Periya